Tai'an Sports Center Stadium is a football stadium in Tai'an, China.  It hosts football matches and hosted some matches for the U-16 Men's Football competition at the 2009 National Games of China.  The stadium holds 32,000 spectators.

External links
Stadium information

Football venues in China
Sports venues in Shandong